Baloda Bazar-Bhatapara district is a district in Chhattisgarh state of India with its headquarters at Baloda Bazar. Before its creation, it was a part of Raipur district.

Administration
The district is subdivided into five tehsils: namely Palari, Baloda Bazar, Kasdol, Bhatapara and Simga and 3 subdivisions namely Baloda Bazar, Bhatapara and Bilaigarh.

The district administration is headed by the district magistrate cum collector, the present Collector and District Magistrate to take charge of the newly formed district is Rajesh Singh Rana.

Demographics 

At the time of the 2011 census, Baloda Bazar district had a population of 1,078,911. Baloda Bazar district has a sex ratio of 1003 females to 1000 males. 13.93% of the population lives in urban areas. Scheduled Castes and Scheduled Tribes make up 229,792 (21.30%) and 148,349 (13.75%) of the population respectively.

At the time of the 2011 Census of India, 93.31% of the population in the district spoke Chhattisgarhi and 5.16% Hindi as their first language.

References

External links
 Official website

 
Districts of Chhattisgarh
States and territories established in 2012